Glenbrook railway station is located on the Main Western line in New South Wales, Australia. It serves the Blue Mountains suburb of Glenbrook.

History
The station opened on 11 May 1913 after the construction of a deviation.

Until October 1990 there was a loop for westbound services opposite platform 2.

In December 2019, an upgrade which included a new lift was completed.

Platforms & services
Glenbrook has one island platform with two faces. It is serviced by NSW TrainLink Blue Mountains Line services travelling from Sydney Central to Lithgow.

Trivia
Glenbrook Station is also the name of a fictional subway station in the roller coaster Xpress: Platform 13 at Walibi Holland in the Netherlands

References

External links

Glenbrook station details Transport for New South Wales

Easy Access railway stations in New South Wales
Railway stations in Australia opened in 1913
Regional railway stations in New South Wales
Short-platform railway stations in New South Wales, 6 cars
New South Wales Heritage Database
Glenbrook, New South Wales
Transport in the Blue Mountains (New South Wales)
Main Western railway line, New South Wales